Chaenorhinum is a genus consisting of four species of annual and perennial herbs native to Turkey and the Mediterranean, where they thrive in dry stony areas and scree. They are closely related to snapdragons. The leaves are linear to oblong or rounded, opposite at the base. The flowers resemble snapdragons, being typically zygomorphic, hooded, lobed and spurred. They are borne in terminal racemes or singly in the leaf axils of the branching stems.

Species
Chaenorhinum minus (also known as "small toadflax" or "dwarf snapdragon",)
Chaenorhinum origanifolium (syn. Chaenorhinum gloriosum)
Chaenorhinum rubrifolium
Chaenorhinum villosum

References

Botanica Sistematica

Plantaginaceae
Plantaginaceae genera
Taxa named by Augustin Pyramus de Candolle